Mark Mulcahy is an American musician and front-man for the New Haven, Connecticut-based band Miracle Legion. The band earned modest renown, especially in their native New England region, but disbanded after a sad turn of events with their record label, Morgan Creek Records. Mulcahy soon formed Polaris, a house band for the mid-1990s alternative television series The Adventures of Pete & Pete (1993–1996). They are perhaps best remembered for the song "Hey Sandy" featured in the opening credits of each show, and for nostalgic tunes such as "Waiting for October" and "Saturnine". Following the cancellation of Pete & Pete, Mulcahy found himself playing his own shows in New York City and rebuilding his career. Mulcahy has opened for notable artists, including Oasis and Jeff Buckley and received homage from Radiohead frontman Thom Yorke, who dedicated a song to Mulcahy at a Boston show. Mark is working on his solo career today via his own label Mezzotint.com.

An essay on Mulcahy's song "Hey Self-Defeater" (from the album Fathering) was featured in Nick Hornby's book 31 Songs.

In 2003, Mulcahy was invited to sing a Haiku poem, "Haiku Three In The Museum Garden",  by Nobel laureate George Seferis, on the international release of  Electronica band Sigmatropic Sixteen Haiku & Other Stories (Hitch Hyke | Tongue Master | Thirsty Ear) which also featured the likes of Robert Wyatt, Laetitia Sadier (Stereolab), Cat Power, Alejandro Escovedo, Mark Eitzel, Lee Ranaldo (Sonic Youth), Howe Gelb & Steve Wynn amongst many others.

A subsequent limited edition 12-inch by Sigmatropic the following year, Could That Be The Voice? (Tongue Master Records), featured Mulcahy on two featured alternate remixes, "Haiku One" and "Haiku Four", as well as contributions by Edith Frost & Carla Torgerson (The Walkabouts).

He also composed the music for and performed in Ben Katchor's 2004 musical, The Slug Bearers of Kayrol Island, or, The Friends of Dr. Rushower. Mulcahy also co-wrote the musical The Rosenbach Company with Katchor.

Mulcahy recorded a cover version of Shania Twain's "From This Moment On" for Engine Room Recordings' compilation album Guilt by Association, which was released in September 2007.

His song "Cookie Jar" was used in the 2008 movie Management over the closing credits.

A tribute album titled Ciao My Shining Star: The Songs of Mark Mulcahy was released on September 15, 2009, featuring contributions from Thom Yorke, Frank Black, The National, Dinosaur Jr., Michael Stipe, Juliana Hatfield, Mercury Rev, David Berkeley, Frank Turner.  The album also serves as a benefit for Mulcahy, whose wife Melissa died in 2008.

Mulcahy re-emerged in 2012 with a reunion show with Polaris at Cinefamily's Everything is Festival III on August 28. Following the performance, a Twitter and Facebook page for Polaris appeared. Mulcahy played a four-date tour in England in early December, including a performance at the All Tomorrow's Parties festival. In addition, Mulcahy's  single "Low Birthweight Child/The Cottage That We Rented Had a Name" was released on December 10 by the UK-based Tongue Master Records. In 2013, he released his first full-length album in eight years, Dear Mark J. Mulcahy, I Love You, and undertook a minor tour in the U.S. Mulcahy appeared on J Mascis' (Dinosaur Jr.), Tied to a Star (2014), singing on two tracks.

Miracle Legion reformed in 2016–2017.

Partial discography
 Fathering (1997) CD on the Mezzotint Label/Loose Music
 C.O.D. (1999) 7-inch vinyl on Lissy Records
 I Just Shot Myself in the Foot Again (2000) EP on Mezzotint
 Smilesunset (2001) CD/LP on Mezzotint/Loose Music
 In Pursuit of Your Happiness (2005) CD on Mezzotint/Loose Music
 Love's the Only Thing That Shuts Me Up (2005) EP on Mezzotint
 Low Birthweight Child ‘ | ‘The Cottage That We Rented Had a Name (2012) - 7-inch vinyl on Tongue Master Records
 Dear Mark J Mulcahy, I Love You (2013) on Fire Records/Mezzotint
 The Possum in the Driveway (2017) on Mezzotint
 The Gus (2019) on Mezzotint
 Franks And A Flag (2020) on Mezzotint

References

External links
 Mark Mulcahy
 Mezzotint record label website

American rock songwriters
American rock singers
American rock musicians
Place of birth missing (living people)
Living people
Singer-songwriters from New York (state)
Year of birth missing (living people)
Loose Music artists
American male singer-songwriters
Singer-songwriters from Connecticut